Steve Gatzos (born June 22, 1961) is a Canadian former professional ice hockey player who played 89 games in the National Hockey League. He played with the Pittsburgh Penguins. As a youth, he played in the 1974 Quebec International Pee-Wee Hockey Tournament with a minor ice hockey team from Toronto.

Career statistics

References

External links

1961 births
Living people
Baltimore Skipjacks players
Canadian ice hockey centres
Canadian people of Greek descent
Ice hockey people from Toronto
Erie Blades players
Fife Flyers players
KHL Medveščak Zagreb players
Muskegon Lumberjacks players
Pittsburgh Penguins players
Pittsburgh Penguins draft picks
Roanoke Valley Rebels players
SaiPa players
Sault Ste. Marie Greyhounds players
Tilburg Trappers players
Canadian expatriate ice hockey players in Croatia
Canadian expatriate ice hockey players in Scotland
Canadian expatriate ice hockey players in the Netherlands
Canadian expatriate ice hockey players in the United States
Canadian expatriate ice hockey players in Finland